Alderwood, formerly Alderwood Mall, is a regional shopping mall in Lynnwood, Washington. It is anchored by JCPenney, Macy's and Nordstrom and comprises both a traditional enclosed mall and two open-air areas known as The Village and The Terraces. Brookfield Properties manages and co-owns the property with an institutional investor.

Alderwood is Snohomish County's largest mall and one of the major malls in the Puget Sound region. Alderwood was named after the unincorporated area called Alderwood Manor where the mall is located on, which is now part of the city of Lynnwood, Washington.

Alderwood Mall is home to one of the world's first Zumiez stores and the United States' first Daiso store.

Description
Alderwood Mall is located near the eastern edge of Lynnwood proper. It stands just west of the junction of Interstate 5, Interstate 405, and State Route 525 in an area bounded by 184th Street Southwest to the north, 33rd Avenue West to the west, Alderwood Mall Boulevard to the south, and Alderwood Mall Parkway to the east. The mall takes up much of the block from the northern end apart from the Alderwood Corner strip mall on the northwest corner. The remaining portion of the block to the south is mainly occupied by office buildings and strip malls, the latter of which include the Alderwood Towne Center and the Alderwood East Shopping Center. Another strip mall, Shane Plaza, was purchased by Alderwood Mall's then co-owner, General Growth Properties, in 2015.

The Edmonds School District also operated a bus barn on the southern end of the block from the late 1980s until 2016, when it opened a new bus barn on 52nd Avenue West. The school district, which owned the land since the 1950s, agreed to sell it to Wolff Enterprises in 2017, but the developer backed out the following year despite filing permits for mixed-use development containing 240 housing units. The school district eventually reached an agreement with another developer, Trammell Crow Residential, to build a mixed-use development containing 383 housing units; known as Alexan Alderwood, it commenced construction in 2021 and is expected to be completed in 2023.

Alderwood Mall is served by Community Transit for several local bus routes as well as Sound Transit Express for route 535, which travels from Lynnwood Transit Center south to Bellevue Transit Center in Bellevue; Community Transit's Swift Orange Line bus rapid transit route, traveling between McCollum Park near Everett and Edmonds College in Edmonds, will also serve the mall when it opens in 2024. As part of the proposed Everett Link Extension, which would extend Link light rail service from Lynnwood Transit Center north to Everett, Sound Transit plans to add a light rail station within the mall's vicinity; it is not expected to open until 2037.

History

On October 4, 1979, after over ten years of delays by developer Edward J. DeBartolo Sr. on land originally owned by Allied Stores, Alderwood Mall finally opened. Its anchors included The Bon Marché (later known as Macy's), Lamonts, Nordstrom, JCPenney and Sears. The mall was later sold to the New York State Common Retirement Fund, which retained DeBartolo's management company to operate the center. It remained essentially unchanged except for the addition of a court and cosmetics renovation in 1995-1996 which cost $12 million. After briefly being managed by Simon Property Group following its acquisition of the DeBartolo mall interests in 1996, General Growth Properties assumed management of the property in 1997. General Growth became co-owner of the mall following the formation of a joint venture with the New York pension fund in 1999.

Facing a major vacancy with the 2000 closure of Lamonts, the mall was renovated and expanded in 2002. The former Lamonts store was purchased and razed for the construction of a new Nordstrom that opened in 2003. The former Nordstrom was leveled in its turn for the construction of The Village, an attached, open-air lifestyle area on the mall's northern side comprising new shops, restaurants and a Borders Group store. A second expansion was simultaneously constructed on the mall's southwest side; named The Terraces, it incorporated an expanded food court and restaurants as well as a 16-screen Loews Cineplex Entertainment multiplex. The theater, which opened on March 25, 2005, replaced an older Grand Cinemas theater that Loews operated just outside the mall boundaries. The expansion included two new parking garages, and the theater was constructed over subterranean parking. The 'mall' was dropped from the name at this time and became simply Alderwood, describing itself as a "lifestyle center".

The Bon Marché was briefly renamed Bon-Macy's in 2003, before assuming the Macy's name in 2005. Despite Loews' subsequent merger with AMC Theatres in 2006, the theater retained the Loews name until 2018, when it assumed the AMC moniker.

In November 2005, Daiso, a Japanese dollar-store, opened its first U.S. store in Alderwood next to Sears. Following the success in its original location, Daiso moved to a larger suite adjacent to JCPenney in 2015 before relocating to a strip mall just outside the mall boundaries in 2017.

The Sears store at the mall was included in the 2015 spin-off of Sears Holdings properties and joint ventures into Seritage Growth Properties. Sears closed the store in March 2017; the  building was torn down in 2019 to make way for redevelopment on the site. The development, which has Dave and Buster's and Dick's Sporting Goods as planned retail tenants, is intended to open in 2022.

In May 2018, Macy's announced an off price store called Macy's Backstage within its store.

In popular culture
The mall is referenced in the 1985 song "Searchin' USA", by the Seattle indie rock band The Young Fresh Fellows from their album Topsy Turvy.

References

Further reading 
Seattle Daily Journal of Commerce

External links 
Alderwood Official Site

Brookfield Properties
Shopping malls in Snohomish County, Washington
Shopping malls established in 1979
Lynnwood, Washington
1979 establishments in Washington (state)